Antonio 'Toni' del Moral Segura (born 29 August 1981) is a Spanish retired footballer who played usually as a left winger.

He amassed Segunda División totals of 214 games and 30 goals during eight seasons, in representation of Celta, Tenerife, Alavés, Cartagena and Girona. In La Liga, he appeared for Racing de Santander.

Football career
Born in Terrassa, Barcelona, Catalonia, Moral appeared with the reserves of both FC Barcelona and Real Madrid, joining RC Celta de Vigo of the second division in 2004–05 only to spend the majority of the season with its B-side. In two of his few appearances with the main squad, against Terrassa FC and Xerez CD, he played while registered with the second team, leading three promotion rivals to unsuccessfully request that the Royal Spanish Football Federation dock points from the Galicians.

From 2006 to 2008, after one year with CD Tenerife, Moral was an instrumental attacking figure for Deportivo Alavés (both teams also competed in the second level). He moved in January 2009 to Racing de Santander, as another forward, Juanjo, was loaned in the opposite direction. He made his La Liga debut as a second-half substitute in a 1–0 away win against Real Valladolid, on the 4th.

In late August 2010, after two seasons being used sparingly, Moral terminated his contract with Racing and signed for FC Cartagena in division two. On 11 September, he scored twice for his new club in a 5–1 home win over FC Barcelona B; he contributed with three goals from 32 games in his second year, with the Murcians being relegated after a three-year stay.

Free agent Moral joined another side in the second tier, Girona FC, for the 2012–13 campaign. Subsequently, at the age of 32, he moved abroad for the first time in his career, signing with Platanias F.C. in the Superleague Greece.

References

External links

1981 births
Living people
Footballers from Terrassa
Spanish footballers
Association football wingers
La Liga players
Segunda División players
Segunda División B players
Tercera División players
FC Barcelona C players
Real Madrid Castilla footballers
RC Celta de Vigo players
CD Tenerife players
Deportivo Alavés players
Racing de Santander players
FC Cartagena footballers
Girona FC players
Super League Greece players
Platanias F.C. players
UAE First Division League players
Al-Ittihad Kalba SC players
Hatta Club players
Spanish expatriate footballers
Expatriate footballers in Greece
Expatriate footballers in the United Arab Emirates